McDonnell Douglas MD-80/MD90 may refer to:

McDonnell Douglas MD-80
McDonnell Douglas MD-90